Aden Lava Flow Wilderness is one of many Wildernesses operated by the  Bureau of Land Management (BLM) in New Mexico. The John D. Dingell, Jr. Conservation, Management, and Recreation Act, signed March 12, 2019, designates the Wilderness as a component of the National Wilderness Preservation System, protecting approximately 27,673 acres.

Prior to its 2019 designation, it was known as the Aden Lava Flow Wilderness Study Area.

It lies within the Potrillo volcanic field southwest of Las Cruces, and is south of County Road B002. Aden Crater lies at the western side of the lava flow.

References

Wilderness areas of New Mexico
Volcanic fields of the United States
Bureau of Land Management areas in New Mexico
Protected areas of Doña Ana County, New Mexico
Organ Mountains–Desert Peaks National Monument
Protected areas established in 2019
2019 establishments in New Mexico